Leophus "Leo" Hayden, Sr. (born June 2, 1948, in Louisville, Kentucky) is a former National Football League running back who played from 1971 to 1973 for the Minnesota Vikings and St. Louis Cardinals. He attended Ohio State and was the Vikings first round draft pick in the 1971 NFL Draft.

As a rookie with the Vikings in 1971 Hayden played almost exclusively on special teams and did not have a single rushing attempt. Hayden later acknowledged that his play was impacted by drug use, and he was cut by the Vikings after one season.  Hayden later said "I knew there were still people on the team I was better than, but I look back on those years of addiction that, because you’re a junkie, there’s no more vile person in the world than a junkie. The reason they call it dope is because it turns you into one.”  He signed with the Cardinals, and spent the 1972 and 1973 seasons with them, but his drug use got worse and he played little and was released after the 1973 season. Hayden signed with the Chicago Fire of the World Football League in March 1974.  But during the Fire's training camp in June he was arrested on a bad check warrant.

After his football career ended, Hayden founded the "National Center for Violence Interruption," a program designed to prevent urban violence. As of 2021, Hayden was director of the inmates re-entry program for New Orleans Parish Louisiana.

References

Database Football

1948 births
Living people
Players of American football from Louisville, Kentucky
American football running backs
Ohio State Buckeyes football players
Minnesota Vikings players
St. Louis Cardinals (football) players